Sixty Days and Counting (2007) is the third book in the hard science fiction Science in the Capital trilogy by Kim Stanley Robinson.  It directly follows the events of Fifty Degrees Below, beginning just after the election of character Phil Chase to the White House. It follows the previous novel's deep freeze of the area surrounding Washington D.C. and details the remediation of the climate in the United States and around the world.

Like other novels by Robinson, Sixty Days and Counting is informed by Buddhism and Buddhist beliefs.

References

2007 American novels
Novels by Kim Stanley Robinson
Novels set in Washington, D.C.
Hard science fiction
Climate change novels
Bantam Spectra books